Gratiola heterosepala is a species of flowering plant known by the common name Boggs Lake hedgehyssop.

It is native to northern California, where it grows in mud and very shallow water, such as the edges of vernal pools. One occurrence of the plant has been noted in Oregon.

Description
Gratiola heterosepala is a small annual herb with reddish-green stems, a few centimeters tall. The thin stems and small leaves are dotted with hairlike glands.

The top of the stem is occupied by an inflorescence that produces centimeter long tubular flowers. Flowers are yellow with white tips and bloom April to September. The plant is threatened by grazing, development, agriculture, recreational activities, and vernal pool loss.

Boggs Lake Ecological Reserve
The plant is found and protected at the Boggs Lake Ecological Reserve in Lake County, California.

References

External links
Jepson Manual Treatment of Gratiola heterosepala
Gratiola heterosepala — U.C. Photo gallery

heterosepala
Flora of California
Flora of Oregon
Flora of the Great Basin
Flora of the Sierra Nevada (United States)
Endemic flora of the United States
Natural history of the California Coast Ranges
Natural history of Lake County, California